Including players from the West Coast Pirates & Perth Reds that have represented while at the club and the years they  achieved their honours, if known.

International

Australia
    Rodney Howe (1997)
    Julian O'Neill (1997)

England
    Barrie-Jon Mather (1997)

Ireland
    Shayne McMenemy (2008)

South Africa
    Halvor Harris (2015)
    Bradley Williams (2015)

State of Origin

New South Wales
    Brad Mackay (1995)

Queensland
    Julian O'Neill (1996)

See also

References

Australian rugby league lists
Lists of Australian rugby league players